Lady's Island may refer to:

 Lady's Island (South Carolina), United States
 Lady's Island Lake, Ireland

See also
 Lacy Island, an uninhabited Canadian arctic island
 "Lady of the Island",a folk song written by Graham Nash